The men's 50m Butterfly event at the 2006 Central American and Caribbean Games occurred on Monday, 17 July 2006 at the S.U. Pedro de Heredia Aquatic Complex in Cartagena, Colombia.

Records

Results

Final

Preliminaries

References

Butterfly, Men's 50m
Men's 50 metre butterfly